Ethyl heptanoate is the ester resulting from the condensation of heptanoic acid and ethanol.  It is used in the flavor industry because of its odor that is similar to grape.

References

Enanthate esters
Ethyl esters
Flavors